The 1998 Lone Star 500 was the tenth round of the 1998 Indy Racing League season. The race was held on September 20, 1998 at the  Texas Motor Speedway in Fort Worth, Texas. Open-wheel veteran John Paul Jr. earned his first win since the 1983 Michigan 500 in a race determined by attrition and fuel strategy. It would be Paul's only win in his IRL career and the only win for Byrd-Cunningham Racing in the series. Rookie Robby Unser scored his first and only podium as well as led the only laps in his career.

The race saw many crashes and problems plague the usual frontrunners, including Arie Luyendyk (fuel pump), Eddie Cheever (engine malfunction), Scott Sharp (crash), Greg Ray (engine malfunction), and Tony Stewart (led 51 laps before an engine problem ended his race). By finishing 5th, points leader Kenny Bräck maintained his comfortable lead in the points standings, all but ensuring he would be the next IRL champion in the next race.

Report

Qualifying

Two laps qualifying. The worst lap from any of the drivers are unknown.

 Changed to a backup car for the race, after repeatedly changing engines during the weekend before loaning one from Panther Racing.

Race

Race Statistics
Lead changes: 17 among 10 drivers

Standings after the race
Drivers' Championship standings

 Note: Only the top five positions are included for the standings.

References

1998 in IndyCar
Lone
Texas Motor Speedway